Nissequogue is a village in Suffolk County, on the North Shore of Long Island, in New York, United States. The village population was 1,564 at the 2020 census.

The Incorporated Village of Nissequogue is located entirely within the Town of Smithtown.

History 
Nissequogue incorporated as a village in 1925.

The Mayor of Nissequogue (as of July 2022), Richard B. Smith, is a descendant and a namesake of the first English settler of the village, Richard Smith (Smythe).

Geography

To the west of the village is its namesake, the Nissequogue River. To the north is Long Island Sound, while to the east is Stony Brook Harbor. Moriches Road runs through the center of the village.

Nissequogue, in its entirety, is served by the St. James Post Office (located in the adjacent hamlet and CDP of St. James) and uses the St. James, New York 11780 ZIP code.

Government 
As of July 2022, the Mayor of Nissequogue is Richard B. Smith, the Deputy Mayor is James F. Donahue, and the Village Trustees are Michael Grosskopf, Kurt J. Meyer, and Maureen C. Potter.

Main attractions 
Nissequogue is known for its preservation of the natural Long Island landscape. Its unique scenery is facilitated by a two-acre minimum on property subdivisions and a ban on industry real estate within the village's boundaries.

Nissequogue's most popular parks are Long Beach Town Park, Short Beach, The David Weld Sanctuary, and The Boney Lane Farm located on the old Boney Lane now known as Short Beach Road.

Demographics

As of the census of 2000, there were 1,543 people, 533 households, and 455 families residing in the village. The population density was 408.9 people per square mile (158.0/km2). There were 570 housing units at an average density of 151.1 per square mile (58.4/km2). The racial makeup of the village was 97.34% White, 0.13% African American, 0.97% Asian, and 1.56% from two or more races. Hispanic or Latino of any race were 2.92% of the population.

There were 533 households, out of which 36.0% had children under the age of 18 living with them, 79.2% were married couples living together, 4.5% had a female householder with no husband present, and 14.6% were non-families. 12.2% of all households were made up of individuals, and 4.3% had someone living alone who was 65 years of age or older. The average household size was 2.89 and the average family size was 3.15.

In the village, the population was spread out, with 25.6% under the age of 18, 4.4% from 18 to 24, 25.3% from 25 to 44, 32.9% from 45 to 64, and 11.9% who were 65 years of age or older. The median age was 42 years. For every 100 females, there were 106.0 males. For every 100 females age 18 and over, there were 100.7 males.

The median income for a household in the village was $140,786, and the median income for a family was $157,973. Males had a median income of $100,000 versus $69,167 for females. The per capita income for the village was $63,148. About 1.1% of families and 2.4% of the population were below the poverty line, including none of those under age 18 and 2.7% of those age 65 or over.

References

External links

Official website

Smithtown, New York
Villages in New York (state)
Long Island Sound
Villages in Suffolk County, New York
Populated coastal places in New York (state)